Intangibles or intangible may refer to:
 Intangible asset, an asset class used in accounting
 Intellectual capital, the difference in value between tangible assets (physical and financial) and market value
 Intellectual property, a legal concept
 Social capital, the expected collective or economic benefits derived from the preferential treatment and cooperation between individuals and groups
 "Intangibles", an episode of The Good Doctor